Mesnil is derived from Latin mansionile, meaning a small mansio or dwelling, and may refer to:

Places

Municipalities
 Mesnil, Mauritius, a suburb in the town of Vacoas-Phoenix
 Mesnil-Bruntel, a commune in the Somme department in northern France
 Mesnil-Clinchamps, a commune in the Calvados department in northwestern France
 Mesnil-Domqueur, a commune in the Somme department in northern France
 Mesnil-en-Arrouaise, a commune in the Somme department in northern France
 Mesnil-Follemprise, a commune in the Seine-Maritime department in northern France
 Mesnil-la-Comtesse, a commune in the Aube department in north-central France
 Mesnil-Lettre, a commune in the Aube department in north-central France
 Mesnil-Martinsart, a commune in the Somme department in northern France
 Mesnil-Mauger, a commune in the Seine-Maritime department in northern France
 Mesnil-Panneville, a commune in the Seine-Maritime department in northern France
 Mesnil-Raoul, a commune in the Seine-Maritime department in northern France
 Mesnil-Rousset, a commune in the Eure department in northern France
 Mesnil-Saint-Georges, a commune in the Somme department in northern France
 Mesnil-Saint-Laurent, a commune in the Aisne department in northern France
 Mesnil-Saint-Loup, a commune in the Aube department in north-central France
 Mesnil-Saint-Nicaise, a commune in the Somme department in northern France
 Mesnil-Saint-Père, a commune in the Aube department in north-central France
 Mesnil-Sellières, a commune in the Aube department in north-central France
 Mesnil-sous-Vienne, a commune in the Eure department in northern France
 Mesnil-sur-l'Estrée, a commune in the Eure department in northern France
 Mesnil-Verclives, a commune in the Eure department in northern France
 Blanc-Mesnil, a former commune in the Seine-Maritime department in northwestern France, now part of Sainte-Marguerite-sur-Mer
 Bosc-Mesnil, a commune in the Seine-Maritime department in northern France
 Dom-le-Mesnil, a commune in the Ardennes department in northern France
 Graignes-Mesnil-Angot, a commune in the Manche department in north-western France
 Grébault-Mesnil, a commune in the Somme department in northern France
 Le Blanc-Mesnil, a commune in the northeastern suburbs of Paris, France
 Le Torp-Mesnil, a commune in the Seine-Maritime department in northern France
 Minaucourt-le-Mesnil-lès-Hurlus, a commune in the Marne department in north-eastern France
 Nagel-Séez-Mesnil, a commune in the Eure department in northern France
 Neuf-Mesnil, a commune in the Nord department in northern France
 Petit-Mesnil, a commune in the Aube department in north-central France
 Saint-Georges-du-Mesnil, a commune in the Eure department in northern France
 Saint-Martin-du-Mesnil-Oury, a commune in the Calvados department in northwestern France
 Saint-Ouen-du-Mesnil-Oger, a commune in the Calvados department in northwestern France
 Saint-Pierre-du-Mesnil, a commune in the Eure department in northern France
 Vieux-Mesnil, a commune in the Nord department in northern France

Other
 Château de Mesnil-Voisin, a French castle located at the heart of the hamlet of "Mesnil-Voisin" in the commune of Bouray-sur-Juine in the department of Essonne

People
 Félix Mesnil (1868-1938), a French zoologist, biologist, botanist, mycologist and algologist
 François-Jean de Mesnil-Durand (1736-1799), a French tactician
 Romain Mesnil (born 1977), a French pole vaulter

See also
 Grandmesnil (disambiguation)
 Le Mesnil (disambiguation)
 Dumesnil